Newman Airport  is an airport near Newman, in the Pilbara region of Western Australia, situated  southeast of the town.

The airport is owned and maintained by the Shire of East Pilbara. Newman's primary air traffic is made up by a mixture of light aircraft, QantasLink and Virgin Australia flights. QantasLink and Virgin Australia fly RPT flights to Perth only (with the exception of their regular charter flights) whereas the lighter aircraft fly to outer communities as well as to Port Hedland and other Pilbara towns.

Airlines and destinations

Statistics
Newman Airport was ranked 28th in Australia for the number of revenue passengers served in financial year 2010–2011.

Operations

See also
 List of airports in Western Australia
 Aviation transport in Australia

References

External links

Newman Airport
 Airservices Aerodromes & Procedure Charts

Pilbara airports
Shire of East Pilbara